The Elmore Football Club is an Australian Rules Football club which competes in the Heathcote District Football League (HDFL).

The club, known as the Elmore Bloods, is based in Elmore, Victoria and has participated in the HDFL since 1948.

The Bloods have appeared in 14 grand finals, winning six; the most recent in 2007.

Location

History

Success (1948 – )
Elmore have won six premierships, all have come in long awaited years because they have been Runners-up more than they have been Premiers. They have been very unlucky in the past having been Runners-up eight times and been Premiers six times and before the 2007 Premiership they were in a flag drought of twenty two consecutive years, which is the third biggest flag drought in the HDFL after Colbinabbin's (22 years) 1950–1975 flag drought and White Hills (29 years) 1988–Present flag drought.

Rivalries
Because of the small sized football league rivalries are few and far between and most teams aren't overly aggressive towards another team, however Elmore's main rivals are Colbinabbin, Huntly, Mount Pleasant & Heathcote

Honours
HDFL

Premierships & Grand Finals

Books
 History of Football in the Bendigo District – John Stoward –

References
ElmoreFNC

Australian rules football clubs in Victoria (Australia)